Georgios Tsilingiris (born 19 September 2001) is a Greek professional footballer who plays as a midfielder for Super League 2 club Makedonikos.

References

2001 births
Living people
Greek footballers
Super League Greece players
Super League Greece 2 players
Xanthi F.C. players
Association football midfielders
Footballers from Xanthi